Jaysri Jeyaraaj and Jeyaraaj Krishnan are artists, who play the South Indian musical instrument Veena.

Lineage
They are directly descendants of the line of students of the well-known composer,  Muthuswami Dikshitar, who is one of the Trinity of Carnatic composers.

Current work
Their residence is in Chennai, India and they regularly give concerts and hold chamber concerts. They are working on a compilation of recordings of all available songs of Muthuswami Dikshitar.

See also
Saraswati Veena

External links
Blog: http://www.veenavaadhini.blogspot.com
Website: http://www.veenajj.com

References

http://www.veenajj.com - Website
 - Two bodies One soul - an interview
http://www.thestatesman.net/index.php?option=com_content&view=article&id=335640:melodious-moments&catid=47:marquee - An article about them

Living people
Indian violinists
Year of birth missing (living people)
Place of birth missing (living people)
Musicians from Chennai
Veena players
21st-century violinists